Hellinsia maldonadoica is a moth of the family Pterophoridae. It is found in Ecuador.

The wingspan is 21 mm. The forewings are pale ochreous-white and the markings are brown. The hindwings and fringes are pale ochreous-white. Adults are on wing in January, at an altitude of 2,850 meters.

Etymology
The species is named after the collecting site: Maldonado.

References

Moths described in 2011
maldonadoica
Moths of South America